Yuraq Q'asa (Quechua yuraq white, q'asa mountain pass, "white mountain pass", also spelled Yuraj Khasa) is a mountain in the Bolivian Andes which reaches a height of approximately . It is located in the Cochabamba Department, Quillacollo Province, Sipe Sipe Municipality.

References 

Mountains of Cochabamba Department